Giuiria is a monotypic genus of Ethiopian jumping spiders containing the single species, Giuiria unica. It was first described by Embrik Strand in 1906, and is only found in Ethiopia.

References

Endemic fauna of Ethiopia
Arthropods of Ethiopia
Monotypic Salticidae genera
Salticidae
Spiders of Africa
Taxa named by Embrik Strand